The 1975 European Super Cup was played on 9 September and 6 October 1975, between Bayern Munich of West Germany and Dynamo Kyiv of USSR. Dynamo won 3–0 on aggregate.

Match details

First Leg

Second Leg

See also
1974–75 European Cup
1974–75 European Cup Winners' Cup
FC Bayern Munich in international football competitions
FC Dynamo Kyiv in European football

References

 RSSSF

1975–76 in European football
Uefa Super Cup 1975
European Super Cup 1975
1975
1975 European Super Cup
1975–76 in German football
1975 in Soviet football
September 1975 sports events in Europe
October 1975 sports events in Europe
Sports competitions in Munich
1976 in West German sport
1970s in Munich
1970s in Kyiv
1975